Mor Dahan ( born March 19, 1989) is a former Israeli football (soccer) defender. He previously played for Maccabi Haifa, Ironi Ramat HaSharon, and Maccabi Ahi Nazareth.

After playing 3 caps for Israel U-18, Dahan moved to make his first appearance for Israel U-19 against Denmark U-19 in a 5–2 win for Israel in the Milk Cup.

He continued to play as Israel won the Milk Cup at 2007. He also played in the qualifiers to U-19 Euro 2008 and then in the 'elite' stage of the qualifiers, which Israel failed to win.

He made his first appearance as a second-half substitute for Maccabi Haifa in the Israeli Premier League on March 22, 2008, versus Ironi Kiryat Shmona. Dahan made five appearances for the club in the 2007–08 season.

References

1989 births
Living people
Israeli Jews
Israeli footballers
Association football defenders
Beitar Nes Tubruk F.C. players
Maccabi Haifa F.C. players
Hapoel Nir Ramat HaSharon F.C. players
Maccabi Ahi Nazareth F.C. players
Hapoel Ashkelon F.C. players
Maccabi Ironi Bat Yam F.C. players
Hapoel Hadera F.C. players
Hapoel Ironi Kiryat Shmona F.C. players
Hapoel Beit She'an F.C. players
Hapoel Ironi Baqa al-Gharbiyye F.C. players
F.C. Haifa Robi Shapira players
Ihud Bnei Kafr Qara F.C. players
Israeli Premier League players
Liga Leumit players
Israeli people of Moroccan-Jewish descent
Footballers from Beersheba